Romeo and Juliet is a 1954 Argentine film directed by Enrique Carreras. The screenplay was written by Rafael Beltrán, based on the plot by Miguel de Calasanz. It stars Alfredo Barbieri, Amelia Vargas, Esteban Serrador and Susana Campos and was released on March 16, 1954.

Plot
An engaged couple rents an apartment that turns out to belong to someone else.

Cast
 Alfredo Barbieri		
 Amelia Vargas		
 Esteban Serrador		
 Susana Campos		
 Tito Climent		
 Guido Gorgatti		
 Domingo Márquez		
 Aída Villadeamigo
 Enrique Lomi
 Esmeralda Agoglia
 Leo Bélico
 Arsenio Perdiguero

Reception
Noticias Gráficas opined: "An argument that rests on equivocation, but without adding any detail that differentiates it from the innumerable number of plays that frivolous theater counts in its copious credit." Raúl Manrupe and María Alejandra Portela in their book Un diccionario de films argentinos (1930–1995) write (translated from Spanish): "A simple comedy to take advantage of the success of the protagonist couple.".

References

External links
 

1953 films
1950s Spanish-language films
Argentine black-and-white films
Films based on Romeo and Juliet
Argentine comedy films
1953 comedy films
1950s Argentine films
Films directed by Enrique Carreras